Macquarie Correctional Centre, an Australian maximum security prison for males, is located in Wellington, New South Wales, Australia,  west of Sydney. The facility is operated by Corrective Services NSW, an agency of the Department of Attorney General and Justice, of the Government of New South Wales. The Centre accepts sentenced felons under New South Wales and/or Commonwealth legislation.

The facility is made up of 14 buildings (primarily single storey) and has three layers of fencing. There is more than 5 km of secure fencing and over 600 security cameras. The centre was completed in just 54 weeks.

The project won the 2018 NSW AIPM Project Management Achievement Awards for Regional Projects.

The jail is next door to the larger Wellington Correctional Centre that has 750 beds.

See also
Punishment in Australia

References

External links
Wellington Correctional Centre website

Prisons in New South Wales
Maximum security prisons in Australia
Wellington, New South Wales